Karen Aslanyan (born 22 July 1995) is an Armenian Greco-Roman wrestler. He won a bronze medal at the European Wrestling Championships in 2018, 2019 and 2020. He also represented Armenia at the 2019 European Games held in Minsk, Belarus where he lost his bronze medal match against Mate Nemeš in the 67 kg event.

He competed in the 67 kg event at the 2020 Summer Olympics in Tokyo, Japan.

Career 

In 2015, he represented Armenia at the Military World Games in Mungyeong, South Korea where he won one of the bronze medals in the 66 kg event.

He won one of the bronze medals in the 67 kg event at the 2020 European Wrestling Championships held in Rome, Italy.

Achievements

References

External links 
 
 
 

Living people
1995 births
Armenian male sport wrestlers
Wrestlers at the 2019 European Games
European Games competitors for Armenia
European Wrestling Championships medalists
Wrestlers at the 2020 Summer Olympics
Olympic wrestlers of Armenia
20th-century Armenian people
21st-century Armenian people
Sportspeople from Yerevan